Karasu is a district of Kostanay Region in northern Kazakhstan. The administrative center of the district is the selo of Karasu. Population:

Geography 
Lake Kushmurun is located in the district, at the border with neighboring Auliekol District.

References

Districts of Kazakhstan
Kostanay Region